Epacris glabella, commonly known as smooth heath, is a species of flowering plant in the heath family, Ericaceae, and is endemic to Tasmania. It is a shrub with erect branches, egg-shaped to elliptic leaves and white, tube-shaped flowers.

Description 
The anthers and style protrude beyond the petal tube. Flowering occurs in spring.

Taxonomy and naming 
Epacris glabella was first formally described in 1991 by S. Jean Jarman in Aspects of Tasmanian Botany - a tribute to Winifred Curtis from specimens collected in 1986. The specific epithet (glabella) means "glabrous".

Distribution and habitat 
Smooth heath grows in soils derived from serpentinite in heath or woodland in hilly places in disjunct populations in north-west Tasmania.

Conservation status
Epacris glabella is listed as "endangered" under the Australian Government Environment Protection and Biodiversity Conservation Act 1999 and the Tasmanian Government Threatened Species Protection Act 1995. The main threats to the species are mining activities, inappropriate fire regimes, and dieback caused by Phytophthora cinnamomi.

References

glabella
Endemic flora of Tasmania
Plants described in 1991